Fight For My Way (lit. Fight My Way) is a South Korean television series starring Park Seo-joon and Kim Ji-won, with Ahn Jae-hong and Song Ha-yoon. It premiered on May 22, 2017, every Monday and Tuesday at 22:00 (KST) on KBS2.

The series was the slot leader during its entire run and topped TV popularity index for 3 consecutive weeks. It was praised for its realistic plot and great performances.

Synopsis
The story is about underdogs with big dreams struggling to survive and striving for success in a career they're under-qualified for. A long time friendship is blossoming into romance between two immature friends Ko Dong-man (Park Seo-joon) and Choi Ae-ra (Kim Ji-won) whose childish dynamic hasn't changed despite reaching adulthood.

Cast

Main

The Crazy Fantastic Four
They are four individuals who are considered to be lacking of abilities, but eventually in the series, they will grow as both individuals and friends.
 Park Seo-joon as Ko Dong-man 고동만 
 Jo Yeon-ho as young Ko Dong-man
A former taekwondo player who used to be famous but had to stop because of a painful past, is now a nameless mixed martial arts fighter. Later, he falls in love with his long time best friend, Choi Ae-ra, while struggling to succeed in his career and love life. 
 Kim Ji-won as Choi Ae-ra 최애라 
 Lee Han-seo as young Choi Ae-ra
A strong and sassy girl. She's working as a department store employee at the information desk but dreams of becoming an announcer. She hasn't given up on her dreams, even though she is not eligible and faces too much humiliation specifically because of her rival in love, Park Hye-ran. She keeps on striving for her dream to come true. 
 Ahn Jae-hong as Kim Joo-man 김주만 
The so-called "brain" of the four. He landed a permanent position at a home shopping network. His loyalty and love for his girlfriend of six years, will be put to the test.
 Song Ha-yoon as Baek Seol-hee 백설희  
 Kim Ha-yeon as young Baek Seol-hee
An innocent and quirky girl of the group, who is working customer service at the home shopping network. For six years, her universe revolves around Joo-man and she is extremely in love with him.

Supporting

People related to Dong-man

 Son Byong-ho as Go Hyung-shik
Dong-man's father. 
 Kim Ye-ryeong as Park Soon-yang
Dong-man's mother. 
 Jo Eun-yoo as Go Dong-hee
 Go Na-hee as young Go Dong-hee
Dong-man's younger sister.
 Lee Elijah as Park Hye-ran
Dong-man's ex-girlfriend. A famous anchor who is divorced after being married to a wealthy man but still has luck in fame and appearance. She's trying to get back with Dong-man after dumping him. 
 Kim Sung-oh as Hwang Jang-ho
Dong-man's taekwondo coach and loyal friend.

People related to Ae-ra

 Jeon Bae-soo as Choi Cheon-gap
Ae-ra's father.
 Jin Hee-kyung as Hwang Bok-hee / Ganako Hwang
A mysterious woman in the village where the main characters live. Choi Ae Ra's mother who left her due to some problems and went to Japan. She had breast cancer which was cured. She returned to South Korea as fantastic four landlady and lived with her adopted son Nam Il. She had a mysterious flip mobile in which she kept many photographs of Ae Ra and Nam Il as memories of their childhood. 
 Kang Ki-doong as Jang Kyung-goo
A broadcasting production director and an acquaintance of Ae-ra.

People related to Joo-man

 Pyo Ye-jin as Jang Ye-jin
Joo-man's new workmate at the home shopping network, secretly a daughter of a wealthy household. She will put Joo-man and Seol-hee's love for each other to the test.
 Kim Hee-chang as Head of Department Choi
Joo-man's and Ye-jin's boss.

People related to Seol-hee

 Lee Jung-eun as Geum-bok
Seol-hee's mother.
 Kim Hak-sun as Baek Jang-soo
Seol-hee's father.

Others

 Kim Gun-woo as Kim Tak-su
A star fighter and Dong-man's biggest rival.
 Yang Kyung-won as Cho-yun
 Chae Dong-hyun as Yang Tae-hee
Tak-su's manager.
 Park Gyu-young as Ahn Su-jeong
 Oh Eui-shik as Manager Oh	
 Yoon Sa-bong as Kim Joo-hye	
 Yang Ki-won as Choi Won-bo
Tak-su's coach.
 Go Geon-han  
 Lee Chae-eun
 Gong Sang-ah
 Lee Seo-hwan
 Baek Ji-won
 Kim Jae-cheol
 Jung Bo-ram
 Yoo Min-joo
 Park Ye-jin
 Yoon Yeo-hak
 Cha Sang-mi
 Kim Se-joon
 Park Seung-chan
 Han Geu-rim
 Ji Sung-geun
 Choi Na-moo
 Choi Hyo-eun as Mai-ei
 Kim Tae-rang (Voice appearance)
 Yoon Ji-yeon (Voice appearance)

Special appearances

 Kwak Dong-yeon as Kim Moo-ki (Ep. 1)
Ae-ra's ex-boyfriend, who cheated on her.
 Jin Ji-hee as Jang Bo-ram (Ep. 1 & 7)
Dong-man's schoolmate.
 Choi Woo-shik as Park Moo-bin (Ep. 1–7)
Dong-man's high school classmate who grew up to be a sweet-seeming but actually conceited doctor. He falls for Ae-ra and tries to win her over but it is later revealed he is engaged.
 Jung Soo-young as Young-sook (Ep. 1)
Moo-ki's new girlfriend who is much older than them and run's a successful restaurant.
 Hwang Bo-ra as Park Chan-sook (Ep. 1 & 2)
Ae-ra's university friend.
 Kim Dae-hwan
 In Gyo-jin as Kim In-gyo
Ae-ra's colleague.
 Jo Mi-ryung as Lee Ji-sook (Ep. 5)
Department store VIP customer.
 Ji Hye-ran as Sonya (Ep. 6 & 8)
Tak-su's girlfriend.
 Shin Yong-moon as Ring Announcer (Ep. 8)
 Kwak Si-yang as Kim Nam-il (Ep. 11–16)
Hwang Bok-hee's son.
 Julien Kang as John Carlos (Ep. 13–14, 16)
Dong-man's trainer.

Production
 The drama is directed by Lee Na-jeong (The Innocent Man) and written by Im Sang-choon (Becky's Back).
 First script reading took place March 24, 2017 at the KBS Annex Building in Yeouido, Seoul, South Korea.
 It was confirmed that the cast and crew of Fight For My Way would be taking a reward vacation to Jeju Island after the conclusion of the drama.

Original soundtrack

Part 1

Part 2

Part 3

Part 4

Part 5

Special Track

Charted songs

Ratings

Awards and nominations

References

External links
  
 
 
 

Korean Broadcasting System television dramas
Korean-language television shows
2017 South Korean television series debuts
2017 South Korean television series endings
South Korean romantic comedy television series
South Korean television series remade in other languages
Television series by Pan Entertainment